Joseph Mensah may refer to:

 Joseph Mensah (footballer) (born 1994), Ghanaian footballer
 Joseph Mensah (police officer) Involved in the Shooting of Alvin Cole
 Joseph Mensah (politician) (born 1957), Ghanaian politician
 Joseph Henry Mensah (1928–2018), Ghanaian politician and economist

See also 
 Joe Mensah (died 2003), Ghanaian musician